One of the first big businesses that developed in the new colony of Australia was the wool industry. It had an important impact on the development of Geelong as the centre of wool sales and exports. Geelong's location and the ambition of local merchants made it perfect for shipping Australian wool worldwide.  As the industry boomed, throughout Geelong large storehouses were built for the storage, assessment, sale and transport of wool bales from throughout Victoria and even further.

As the industry declined the buildings were no longer required for their original purpose and fell into disrepair, some being lost to demolition.  Those surviving have now been repurposed for a variety of functions, which allows the city to continue to develop whilst still celebrating its heritage.

The Woolstore's Architecture 
Prior to the 1850s wool storage was fragmented within Geelong. Few Geelong merchants handled wool exclusively. However, as the economic importance of wool began to rise, local wool brokers recognised the need for local auctions and sales. C.J Denny was a leading figure in creating collective action to commence wool auctions in Geelong. He proposed a series of objectives to establish a Local Wool Mart in Geelong. These were:
To concentrate into one spot a sufficient number of bales of all wools intended for public sale, as will afford owners an opportunity of comparing the condition of their respective clips, and to purchase, a ready and rapid examination of the lots.
To attract purchasers from all parties by the quantity and quality of the wool offered at each sale.
To lot off the wool…so as to increase the circle of purchasers. 
To avoid the expense of transmission of a re-shipment from the Melbourne wool warehouse.

These aims served to influence the design of Woolstores that were built in Geelong. Subsequent stores were required to meet certain demands. This included the parameters of location, light, space, size, handling facilities and ventilation. In 1857, C.J Dennys conducted the first wool auction in Geelong. As the wool industry expanded, large numbers of modern Woolstores were built, altered, and extended.

Dennys Lascelles & Co. 
In 1872, Dennys Lascelles bluestone Woolstore was erected. Architect Jacob Pitman designed the basement of the building and Jonathan Coulson designed the remainder of the building. The Woolstore measured 132 x 64 ft.

Windows featured on every side of the building. These were incorporated with the intention that two rows of bales could be placed between each window, leaving a well-lighted passage between each double row of bales. These windows also allowed for adequate ventilation. The cellar, used for the sale of hides and skins, included a cement floor. With the light from the windows, this feature was intended to ensure ideal temperatures in summer and winter. A pivotal feature of the building was the show floor that measured 129 x 61 ft. The walls and ceilings were painted pale grey to control lighting. This was to enable buyers and growers a high standard of visibility when inspecting products. The Woolstore is positioned on a slight incline, affording facilities for waggons to load and unload on the ground floor.

The 1872 Woolstore was the first building in Victoria planned to facilitate the storage, inspection, and marketing of wool in one operation and upon completion was the second largest store in the colony. Over the years, extensions to the bluestone building were added, including a mansard tower in 1889. These extensions reflected small variations in detailing.

In 1880, an additional building was erected to the west of the original building, in Brougham Street. While incorporating elements of the original design, the store was made of rendered cement, a material more widely used at the time on construction. The Woolstore was deliberately misaligned with the 1872 façade. This gave the impression that the building was only two storeys, rather than its actual three.

In 1910 a major extension, constructed of reinforced concrete, was added to the original 1872 building. Edward Giles Stone designed the new store. Stone was known for pushing design boundaries and has been credited for influencing design trends into the 1920s. The most striking feature of the building was the bow string truss roof system. This consisted of a 55 x 52 metre concrete roof span. This was roofed without any intermediate columns.  The saw tooth roof trusses, which pass through the giant curved concrete structure, allowed for abundant natural light to flow into the building. This allowed for ideal viewing of products on the new show floor. Whilst formerly known as the Denny Lascelles Woolstore, it became known as the Bow Truss Building. Despite the building’s listing on several Heritage Registers, it was controversially demolished in the 1990s.

Strachan & Co. 
Strachan & Co. had been associated with the wool industry since 1840. Their Woolstore complex provides a contrast in design to the Dennys Lascelles buildings, located a block adjacent.

In 1889 a two-storey brick Woolstore was erected. The building features a façade consisting of five bays with segmental arch headed windows. The load bearing red brick walls was topped with a simple parapet. This design was to directly influence subsequent Woolstores constructed in the complex.

In 1896 a three-storey section, south of the original building, was constructed in Moorabool Street. A further extension was added in 1925 to embrace the whole of the Moorabool St and Corio Terrace frontages. The final addition was completed in 1954.

Whilst the construction period of the complex spanned six-five years, stylistic features remained consistent. This gave the group of buildings uniformity and can be considered a complete entity, despite the lengthy construction period.

Dalgety & Co. 
The first Dalgety & Co Woolstore was built in 1891. The newly established Geelong architecture firm, Laird and Buchan, designed the building. The building was a two-storey brick and render built on Gheringhap Street.

The design for the 1891 Woolstore consisted of a two-storey warehouse and office building without a basement level. The structure had solid brick walls and an enclosed timber roof, floor, and structural system. This became the model for all later Woolstores built of Dalgety’s on the site. In 1896, an additional storey, consisting of a brick show floor was added to the 1891 Woolstore. The addition copied the earlier structure in almost every way.

A further Woolstore was built in 1901. Similar to Strachan’s Woolstore, it was constructed using red brick. However, the building reflects a very different design. The north east side of the Woolstore consists of small windows with the façade unified by the use of giant arched panels of brickwork. This design closely resembles Woolstores constructed in Sydney in the late 1890s. The overall form and scale of the store closely resembled the 1891 building, however, with the addition of a basement.

In 1940 a three-storey brick building with basement was built on the corner of the Gheringhap and Brougham streets. This also included the construction of a new façade along the entire length of Gheringhap Street. Consequently, the original exterior of the 1891 building was refaced with red brick. This alteration related to the new Woolstores that were built in the 1950s and 60’s. There were some distinctive features to the 1940 Woolstore.

The building included a spacious show floor that allowed the entire store to hold 55,000 bales of wool. It also incorporated large sliding doors on the west and south, façades that allowed for ventilation to regulate the temperature. The ceiling height was greatly increased, and by the use of steel columns and roof trusses the number of columns within the space were reduced to a single row of seven in the centre. The saw tooth roof form was retained but the scale increased dramatically.

Social Context

The rise of the woolstore 
Geelong’s woolstores are closely associated with the growth of Geelong as a commercial centre, supporting pastoral and agricultural interests in Victoria, particularly the wool industry. The first Australian wool was sold at Garraway’s Coffee House in London in 1821 - a place where businessmen would gather, and various goods were auctioned off. Between 1830 and 1850, Australian wool exports increased from 892 tonnes to 18,791 tonnes.

The swift growth of the industry made the pastoralists wealthy. The wool trade became highly profitable, and local spaces for storage and sale were needed to facilitate the shipping of wool. In 1840, James Strachan constructed the first woolstore in Geelong. In 1857, Charles Dennys conducted the first wool auction in Geelong, which highlighted the possibility of a local wool trade. The other consequence of the rapid growth of the wool industry was that the population of Geelong grew quickly. The small town became a booming sea port, and between 1841 and 1843, the population exploded from 454 to 2,065.

At first, the growth of large wool firms in Geelong was checked by their resources. However, by the 1870s, large investments by British banks and finance companies bolstered the industry significantly, ensuring its significance as Australia's biggest export. Vastly expanded woolstores were constructed throughout Geelong and the country.

As a signifier of this economic expansion, the Dennys, Lascelles Ltd woolstore, constructed in 1872, now houses the National Wool Museum, and is emblematic of the design that became popular in the construction of woolstores in Geelong and the wider region.

The growth of Geelong as the centre of the wool industry wasn’t without its competitors. Melbourne considered itself the centre of exports and sales. By commencing wool sales in Geelong, Charles Dennys fuelled the competitiveness, stating that making Geelong the centre would save costs for local agriculturalists as they wouldn’t need to cover the costs of shipping to Melbourne.

By the 1890s, wool made up two-thirds of Australia’s exports. That meant the industry provided a huge number of employment opportunities, many of which centred around woolstores.

Victoria was the centre of a lively union movement, with workers fighting for better conditions and wages, and the woolstores weren't immune to that. The main unions involved in Geelong woolstores were the Amalgamated Fellmongers Woolsorters & Woolscourers Union of Australia, the Wool and Basil Workers' Federation of Australia, the Federated Storemen and Packers' Union of Australia, and the Wool & Skin Stores Employees Union. Even if woolstore workers weren’t striking, others involved in the industry were. Throughout the late nineteenth century, strikes by wharf workers meant wool couldn’t be shipped. There were also significant strikes by shearers in the 1890s.

The decline of the industry 
Two World Wars and an economic depression seriously affected not only available labour and demand, but also the price of wool. Although the industry boomed briefly in the 1950s, the growing popularity of synthetic fibres, rising production costs, and sinking international prices threatened the industry. As a response, the Australian government introduced a protectionist reserve price scheme in 1974, which involved the government acquisition of the wool clip if the price fell below a certain level. The scheme continued until 1991, when it was buried by so much excess wool that it threatened to overwhelm the Australian economy. The industry was forced to shrink, and mineral extraction took over as the core of the Australian economy.

The woolstores in the Geelong area had closed by the late 1970s, when notable local firms such as Strachan and Denny’s were acquired in 1978 by the Australian Mercantile Land & Finance Company, which had its main centres in London, Sydney, Melbourne and Brisbane.

Functions of a Woolstore 
The Dennys Lascelles Wool and Produce Warehouse was the first building in Victoria planned to facilitate the storage, inspection and marketing of wool in one operation and upon completion, was the second largest store in the colony.  Certain specialist functions developed in these storage buildings e.g. the raising of the entire ground floor to a convenient loading level from the street frontage, allowing a basement underneath, containing the wool press.

A Woolstore carried out the following functions for growers and brokers:
Receive
House 
Store
Display 
Dispatch

Receive 
From the 1870s wool, skins and hides were delivered to the Woolstores by bullock dray and were sorted, stored and catalogued.  
At first transport was largely by drays, bullock wagons and even riverboats brought bought the wool clip in bales from outback stations, then rail and road transport took over.  Wool continued to come and go by land, sea and rail.
Specialised sorters and packers would sort the wool depending on where it was going once it was received into the stores.

By the early 1950s it was realised that all this handling was unnecessary and professional wool classers began to be employed on the stations and the wool was properly packed at the beginning of its journey.

House 
Wool was weighed, conveyed, classed, baled, branded, stored, displayed, marketed and sold.

Within multi-storey ‘wool-warehouses’ bales were moved on trolleys, by steam or hydraulic lifts and dropped down chutes.  Within the one-storey modern wool store, wool was moved by vehicles.  
Improvements made to Woolstores in the 1940s included metal wool gates for dividing the wool, electric lifts and elevators, wool presses and wool drops.

Wool brokers charged growers a fee for handling and selling the wool in the store.  Brokers also provided a range of other services such as credit facilities, banking, advice, and hotel and travel bookings.  They linked the wool grower to the outside world of commerce and international trade.  
As buildings that were visited by clients, whether they be buyers or suppliers, the stores had to provide a reasonable level of amenity and could not simply be regarded as large sheds.  Changing rooms and showers were also installed in the larger Woolstores for use of buyers and growers and of course the offices of wool valuers.

Store 
Immediately before classing ‘skirting’ happened, the object being to render the fleece as evenly as possible by removing any wool which did not match the major portion of the fleece. Once a fleece has been handled, baled and pressed it did not lend itself to further skirting.  Skirting and packing enhanced the value of the wool clip as a whole. 
Classing was one of the most important jobs i.e. grading of the skirted fleece in its entirety.  This was the application of sound knowledge acquired from experience and practice.  Wool was put into lines according to its class. 
The first thing was to separate the Woollen and Worsted by the Wool Sorters, then the fleece was graded according to the following factors:
Quality: referred to the diameter of the fibre, which was indicated by the even-ness and number of crimps. 
Soundness: tensile strength, ability to withstand tension placed on the fibre during the combing process.   
Length of staple: there were well defined lengths for long, medium and short wools for each quality or count. 
Condition: was the amount of yoke and moisture adhering to the wool fibre. 
Other important factors were:
Colour: Pure white wools gave the widest field of usefulness.
Style: character, clearness of colour, bloom or lustre, regularity, elasticity, distinctiveness of crimp, pliancy, softness and fullness all contributed to the seven distinct standards of style in wool: Choice or extra super, Super, Good to super, Good, Good Average, Average and Inferior.

After greasy wool had been sorted and classed it was scoured.  All impurities such as grease or yolk, sweat and earthy matter were removed by scouring or washing in a solution of soap and weak alkali.  
Carbonizing was necessary when burr, seeds or any other vegetable matter was of such a nature that it could not be eliminated by carding, combing and subsequent processes. 
Carding was where fine wire teeth removed foreign matter, smooth and straighten out the fibres.  The mesh was then condensed into a soft rope form known as a silver. 
Backwashing and gilling occurred to straighten out the fibre and sometimes oil was added as a substitute for the lost natural grease. 
Finally, combing straightened the long fibres and removed all the short and imperfect fibres.  The rejected wool collected was known as the Noil. 
A ball of continuous length known as a ‘top’ was the result which was ready for packing.

Display 
After the bulk classers had sorted the wool, it was taken to bins, examined by an overlooker and then made into sale bales, sent to be shown by wool lifts.  The warehouse show floors made sure to provide ample space and light, which would mean wool from different districts could be easily separated. One of the ways in which this was achieved was the use of saw tooth roofs.  
The new Woolstores built in 1872 put Geelong on par with Melbourne.  They were especially built for wool and were designed by keeping wool selling needs in mind, which included storage, inspection, viewing and sales.

Owners of the wool were able to readily compare the condition of their clips. It also meant that those buying could examine the wool lots quickly.  On sale days, the wool was moved up to the top floor, with its bright natural light, and opened so that potential buyers could inspect the wool. Often sampling occurred on the show floor where wool was taken and assessed. The raw wool would be sold at auction and then dispatched by road, rail or sea.

Dispatch 
In Geelong, wool was brought down to the beach to be put on a ship and delivered. When dispatching wool, it needed to be packed well enough to survive the sea trip and the handling later in its journey.  This was done by sorters and packers initially and then after the 1950s professional wool classers performed the job.
Bales that were waiting to be delivered were in warehouse stacks. Local orders were delivered immediately.
The initial storemen lived on the woolstore land and these woolstores were built near various transport facilities.

Jobs in Dalgetty's store 
Manager, Head Valuer, Valuers, Re-classers, Bulk classers, Pressers, Branders, Wool clerk, Receivals, Engineers, Sheep skins, Hides, Manager and Head Auctioneer, Paymaster and Office Master, Store Foreman, Cataloguer, Head Fossicker, Wool Manager, Auctioneer, Auctioneer/Office, Company Secretary, Traveller, Receptionist.

Geelong and the wool industry: then and now 
The decline and fall of the wool industry is a riches-to-rags tale of an economic power that was not only the backbone of the national economy, but also a part of Australian culture and folklore. In the mid-twentieth century, Australia boasted the greatest wool industry in the world. Yet toward the end of the century, the industry declined to be a third of its former size because of flawed economic, fiscal, and industrial government policies.

The city of Geelong is closely associated with the wool industry. For many years the city was known as the 'wool centre of the world'. Sheep farming began here in 1835 and numerous Woolstores were opened from the second half of the century onward. Today, Geelong stands as an emerging health, education and advanced manufacturing hub. Despite experiencing the drawbacks of losing much of its heavy manufacturing, it positions itself as one of the leading non-capital Australian cities.

Significance of the Geelong Woolstores Historic Area 
The Geelong Woolstores Historic Area is one of remarkable coherence and integrity. The Area represents an important aspect of the process of settling the land in Victoria. For Australians as inhabitants of an industrial nation, the last century may be considered as the most relevant period of their past since the specific changes made during that period provide the foundation of their present society. Significant Woolstore groups do exist elsewhere in Australia, but they do not match the group qualities of the Geelong Woolstores and were not specifically erected for the storage, handling and marketing of wool.

Thus, the former Dennys Lascelles Woolstores can be seen as quintessentially Australian as a manifestation of the wool industry. These buildings meet criterion A (Importance to the course, or pattern, of Victoria's cultural history), F (Importance in demonstrating a high degree of creative or technical achievement at a particular period), and H (Special association with the life or works of a person, or group of persons, of importance in Victoria's history). They can be associated with the fifth topic of the Victorian Historical Themes (“Building Victoria’s Industries and Workforce”, subtheme “wool processing”).

Revitalisation of the Woolstores Conservation Area and Waterfront 
With the decline of the wool industry, the Woolstores and associated commercial and industrial buildings turned obsolete. Consequently, since the early 1980s the Waterfront and Woolstores Conservation Area entered into a revitalisation process. In that sense, new uses and contemporary creative interpretation practices have been promoted in the buildings. The aim of this project is also to preserve the inner city’s landscape and its unique architectural character, since the area shares an architectural integrity that gives a local distinctiveness to the city and its port.

Moreover, to preserve the aesthetic and historical values of the buildings, as well as the streetscape, the Greater Geelong Planning Scheme established some strategies and policy guidelines, making sure that any “external alterations (would) make a positive contribution to the built form and (the) amenity of the area”; while at the same time raising awareness that such constructions are a legacy for future generations that represent the community’s identity. 
For instance, the former Dalgety & Co. Woolstore became the Deakin University Waterfront campus in a project that won the President’s Award for Recycled Buildings in 1997. This event became the starting point of Geelong’s business central district revival, and signified the arrival of the modern age in the ‘new Geelong’.

The twenty seven buildings situated in the Woolstores Conservation Area have found a new purpose, mainly related to entertainment, education and tourism:  seven of them are now restaurants, bars, or event centres, three are part of a shopping mall (Westfield Geelong), two are offices, one is a university (Deakin University), another one a hotel (Bush Inn Hotel), one complex  a Museum (National Wool Museum), six buildings were demolished, and the current use of the remaining three is unknown. 	
Geelong’s Woolstores Conservation Area was not the only one in Australia to go through these urban reinvention processes. During the last two decades, other Woolstores located in Adelaide, Brisbane, Fremantle, Melbourne, and Sydney have also encountered new uses as apartments, offices and shopping centres.

A Timeline of Geelong's Woolstores 
1838 - Geelong was proclaimed a town and two stores, the Woolpack Inn and a customs station were opened. 
1872- Construction of the former Dennys Lascelles wool store in blue stone (Moorabool Street). At the time of its construction, it was the second largest wool store in the colony after Goldsborough & Co. in Melbourne.
1889 - The four-storey brick complex of the Strachan, Murray and Shannon Woolstore (now housing the Westfield shopping centre) was constructed.
1917 - The George Hague & Co. Woolstores were partially demolished.
1970-80 - The wool industry weakened. The buildings turned obsolete due to changes in wool selling and handling.
1988 - Creation of the National Wool Museum in the former Dennys Lascelles Woolstore in Moorabool street. 
1990- Demolition of the Bow Truss Building (built in 1910) in a controversial decision. 
1996- Establishment of the Deakin University Waterfront campus in the former Dalgety & Co. Woolstore.
1998- Opening of the Westfield shopping centre in three former woolstores. Today, only the façade of the Strachan Woolstores Complex remains.
2000 onwards- Redevelopment of former Woolstores and associated buildings into commodity amenities

References 

n.d. Australian Heritage. Accessed May 25, 2017 http://www.heritageaustralia.com.au/victoria/2903-geelong.

2017. City by the Bay Concept - 1981. Accessed May 29, 2017.
http://www.intown.com.au/historic/city-by-the-bay.htm.

Dennys, Lascelles, Austin & Co. 1907. “Fifty years selling wool in Geelong, 1857-1907.” Access this item through State Library Victoria.

Fitzgerald, Ross. 2011. “How an Industry Got Fleeced”. The Australian.   HYPERLINK "http://www.theaustralian.com.au/arts/books/how-an-industry-got-fleeced/news-story/529981df29056081b19524bfecdfa119"   http://www.theaustralian.com.au/arts/books/how-an-industry-got-fleeced/news-story/529981df29056081b19524bfecdfa119

Geelong Regional Libraries. 1983. Dennys Lascelles Woolstore, Bourhan Street.
Accessed May 25, 2017. http://catalogue.grlc.vic.gov.au/client/en_GB/public/search/results?qu=dennys&rm=ERESOURCES0%7C%7C%7C1%7C%7C%7C1%7C%7C%7Ctrue&isd=true.
Greater Geelong Local Government Area (LGA). 2017. "Greater Geelong Planning Scheme." Planning Schemes Online. May 25. Accessed May 17, 2017. http://planningschemes.dpcd.vic.gov.au/schemes/greatergeelong.

Heritage Council of Victoria. n.d. "Dennys Lacelles Wool Stores ." Victorian Heritage Database Report. Accessed May 25, 2017.
http://vhd.heritagecouncil.vic.gov.au/places/536/download-report.

Heritage Council of Victoria. n.d "Strachan, Murray and Shannon Woolstore (facades only)." Victoria Heritage Databaser Report. Accessed May 5, 2017.
http://vhd.heritagecouncil.vic.gov.au/places/21960/download-report.

Heritage Council of Victoria, Victoria’s Framework of Historical Themes (Melbourne, 2010).

Houghton, Norman. 2017. "The story of Geelong." City of Greater Geelong. April 7.
Accessed May 22, 2017. http://www.geelongaustralia.com.au/geelong/article/item/8d0779e8d5e7ee6.aspx.

Museum, National Wool Centre- Wool. n.d. "History of Wool- From Clip to Strip." Geelong Regional Commission.

2017. "National Architecture Award Winners 1981-2016." Australian Institute of
Architects. Accessed May 25, 2017. http://www.architecture.com.au/docs/default
source/national-architecture-awards---national-office/national-architecture-awards
1981-2016.pdf.

National Trust of Australia (Victoria). 1980. Woolstores Conservation Area. Melbourne:
National Trust of Australia.

Provincial Victoria. 2008. "Schools's in for the smart new Geelong." The beste place to
live. The Geelong Region. Accessed May 25, 2017.
http://www.geelongaustralia.com.au/bestplacetolive/learn/1.html.

Selenitsch, Alexander. 1967. Geelong Wool stores (Thesis). Thesis, School of
Architecture, Melbourne University, Melbourne, Victoria: Melbourne University,
School of Architecture.

Williams, Bob. 1993. An historical record of the great wool store days. Keilor.

Buildings and structures in Geelong
Victorian Heritage Register Barwon South West (region)
Economy of Geelong